Aklakur Rahman, better known as Akke Rahman, is a British Bangladeshi mountaineer. In October 2020 he broke the UK record for climbing Mount Elbrus, reaching the summit in less than 24 hours. In May 2022, he became the first British Muslim to climb Mount Everest.

Charity ascents 
In July 2020, Akke climbed Mount Kilimanjaro and Mont Blanc, raising £5,000 for Westwood High School in Oldham.

In October 2020, Akke climbed Mount Elbrus without acclimatisation in less than 24 hours, five days after recovering from coronavirus. On this ascent he raised money for the Global Relief Trust.

Akke's first attempt to climb Mount Elbrus was in September 2019. The attempt was abandoned due to dangerous weather conditions, however he still raised more than £2500 to build wells in Bangladesh.

In May 2022, he climbed Mount Everest, becoming the first British Muslim to make the ascent and raising over $100,000 for 'Peak Humanity' charities supporting destitute families in Afghanistan, Syria and Burma.

References 

British mountain climbers
1982 births
Living people
People from Jagannathpur Upazila
21st-century Bengalis
British Muslims